The Suceava–Oar Motorway, also known as the North Motorway, labelled A14, is a planned motorway in the northern part of Romania that upon completion will link Southern Bukovina to Maramureș and further to the Central and Western Europe countries. It will begin in Suceava (at the junction with the A7 motorway) and pass through Vatra Dornei, Bistrița, Dej, Baia Mare and Satu Mare, connecting with Hungary's also-planned M49 expressway near Oar. It will be 335 km long.

As of 2021, the segment between Satu Mare and Oar (14 km) is in the project phase.

See also
Roads in Romania
Transport in Romania

References

Motorways in Romania
Proposed roads in Romania